Tikeyevo (Täkäy) is a rural locality (a village) in Nadezhdinsky Selsoviet, Iglinsky District, Bashkortostan, Russia. The population was 117 as of 2010. There are 6 streets.

Geography 
Tikeyevo is located 40 km east of Iglino (the district's administrative centre) by road. Sotsialistichesky is the nearest rural locality.

References 

Rural localities in Iglinsky District